Steven Rattazzi is an American actor. He provides the voice for the character of Doctor Byron Orpheus on the Adult Swim animated series The Venture Bros. He made his Broadway debut in 2017 playing multiple roles - like most of the others in the cast he was credited simply as "actor"- in the Tony Award-winning play-with-music Indecent. Rattazzi has also done some Off-Off-Broadway shows. He will be the last voice of Hank the Cowdog.

Filmography

References

External links
 
 Playbill story on Rattazzi

American male voice actors
American male stage actors
American male television actors
Year of birth missing (living people)
Living people